The 68th Separate Jager Infantry Brigade "Oleksa Dovbush" is a brigade of the Ukrainian Ground Forces formed in 2022.

History 
The Brigade's units are designed to conduct combat operations in forest and swampy areas, and are staffed by military personnel with experience in combat operations or with civilian activities related to the specifics of the Brigade.

Structure 
As of 2023 the brigade's structure is as follows:

 68th Separate Yeger Brigade
 Headquarters & Headquarters Company
 1st Mechanized Battalion
 2nd Mechanized Battalion
 3rd Mechanized Battalion
 Tank Battalion
 Artillery Group
 Anti-Aircraft Defense Battalion
 Reconnaissance Company
 Engineer Battalion
 Logistic Battalion
 Signal Company
 Maintenance Battalion
 Radar Company
 Medical Company
 CBRN Protection Company

References 

Military units and formations of the 2022 Russian invasion of Ukraine
Military units and formations of Ukraine
Military of Ukraine